St. Maurice Methodist Church is a historic Methodist church (building) at the junction of LA 477 and U.S. Highway 71 in St. Maurice in Winn Parish, Louisiana, across from the U.S. post office of St. Maurice. It was built in 1874 and added to the National Register in 1997.

It has a central entrance tower with a pyramidal roof topped by a cross.  The tower and the main block of the church are covered with weatherboard held by square nails.  It has a tin roof, which was originally of shake construction.

References

Churches on the National Register of Historic Places in Louisiana
Churches completed in 1874
Buildings and structures in Winn Parish, Louisiana
National Register of Historic Places in Winn Parish, Louisiana